Hyalopsocus morio is a black coloured species of Psocoptera from the Psocidae family that can be found in Great Britain, Ireland, Poland, Romania, and in every country of Western Europe (except for Finland, Luxembourg and Scandinavia).

References

Psocidae
Insects described in 1794
Psocoptera of Europe